Below are lists of political parties espousing Islamic identity or political Islam in various approaches under the system of Islamic democracy. Islamic democracy refers to a political ideology that seeks to apply Islamic principles to public policy within a democratic framework. Lists are categorized by the ideological affiliation and sorted by the country of origin.

Islamic liberal
This is a list of political parties espousing Islamic liberalism as its main ideology.

Moderate, Progressive Islamic / Centrist 
This is a list of political parties espousing Islam as its main identity without principal adherence to the particular ideology of political Islam, or taking a theological position of wasat which advocates for politico-religious centrism.

Non-Ruling parties 
  – National Islamic Movement of Afghanistan
  – Islamic Renaissance Movement (part of Green Algeria Alliance), Movement for Democracy in Algeria
  – Al-Menbar Islamic Society
  – Bangladesh Islami Front, Islami Oikya Jote, Bangladesh Congress
  – Al-Wasat Party
  – Peace Party of India
  – Union of Islamic Iran People Party, Moderation and Development Party
  – Islamic Action Organisation, Islamic Dawa Party (part of National Iraqi Alliance), Islamic Fayli Grouping in Iraq, Islamic Labour Movement in Iraq, Islamic Union of Iraqi Turkoman
  – Islam Democrats 
  – Moro Islamic Liberation Front, United Bangsamoro Justice Party

Islamist

Sunni
This is a list of political parties espousing Sunni Islamism as its main ideology.

Defunct Parties 
  —  – Committee for National Revolution
  – Reform Star Party
  – National Salvation Party, National Development Party

Banned Parties: 
  – Islamic Salvation Front
  – Welfare Party, National Order Party, Welfare Party, Virtue Party
 – Islamic Renaissance Party of Tajikistan

Parties without lower-house representation 
 – Jamiat-e Islami, Islamic Dawah Organisation of Afghanistan
 – Movement for National Reform
  – Bangladesh Jamaat-e-Islami, Islamic Front Bangladesh, Bangladesh Islami Front, Islami Andolan Bangladesh
  – Freedom and Justice Party, Building and Development Party, Islamic Party
  – Crescent Star Party
  – Hadas
  – Islamic Labor Front, Islamic Unification Movement, Hizb ut-Tahrir, Najjadeh Party
  – Homeland Party
  – Islamic Democratic Party, Adhaalath Party
  – Jamiat Ahle Hadith
  – Muslim Brotherhood of Syria
  – Free Cause Party, New Welfare Party

Shia
This is a list of political parties espousing Shia Islamism as its main ideology.

Defunct Parties 
 – Islamic Party of Azerbaijan
  – Al Wefaq, Islamic Action Society

Banned parties 
  – People's Mujahedin of Iran

Parties without lower-house representation 
 – Islamic Unity Party of Afghanistan, People's Islamic Unity Party of Afghanistan, Islamic Movement of Afghanistan, National Islamic Unity Party, Islamic Movement of Afghanistan, National Solidarity Party
  – Bahrain Freedom Movement, Islamic Action Society

 – ISLAM

 – Justice and Peace Alliance

  – Free Shia Movement, Union of Muslim Ulama
  – Alliance of Builders of Islamic Iran, Islamic Coalition Party,
  – National Iraqi Alliance, Al-Muwatin, Al-Sadiqoun Bloc, Ataa Movement, Eradaa Movement, Hezbollah Movement in Iraq, Islamic Action Organisation, Islamic Fayli Grouping in Iraq, Islamic Supreme Council of Iraq, National Reform Trend
  – Tehrik-e-Jafaria

Islamic Socialism 
This is a list of political parties espousing Islamic Socialism as its main ideology.

Parties without lower-house representation 
 – Bangladesh Freedom Party

  – Egyptian Arab Socialist Party, Egyptian Islamic Labour Party, Egyptian Liberation Party, Social Justice Party, Umma Party, Young Egypt Party
 – Qaumi Watan Party
  – Islamic Socialist Party

Banned parties 
 – Libyan Popular National Movement

Defunct parties 
 – Office for the Cooperation of the People with the President

 – Mauritanian People's Party

 – Muslim Socialist Committee of Kazan

 – Somali Revolutionary Socialist Party

 – Socialist Cooperation Party

Salafist

This is a list of political parties espousing Salafism as its main ideology.

Defunct Parties 
 – Young Kashgar Party

Parties without lower-house representation 

  – Hezb-e Islami Gulbuddin, Islamic Dawah Organisation of Afghanistan
  – Al Ansar Party, People Party
  – Adhaalath Party
  – Justice and Development Party

Sufism and Ash'arism

Parties without lower-house representation 
 – Egyptian Liberation Party, Victory Party, Voice of Freedom Party, Egyptian Liberation Party

See also

Islamic democracy
Political aspects of Islam
Islam Yes, Islamic Party No

References

 
Political parties
Islamic
Lists of political parties